Anthony John Hurt (born 30 March 1946) is a former New Zealand rower who won two Olympic medals. At the 1972 Summer Olympics in Munich, he teamed with Dick Joyce, Wybo Veldman, John Hunter, Lindsay Wilson, Joe Earl, Trevor Coker and Gary Robertson and Simon Dickie (cox) to win the gold medal in the eights. At the 1976 Summer Olympics in Montreal, he again crewed the eight which this time won the Bronze medal. His crewmates this time were Alec McLean, Ivan Sutherland, Trevor Coker, Peter Dignan, Lindsay Wilson, Joe Earl and Dave Rodger and Simon Dickie (cox). In both Olympic races, he was the stroke.

Hurt later had a plumbing business in Auckland.

References

External links 
 

1946 births
Living people
New Zealand male rowers
Olympic gold medalists for New Zealand in rowing
Olympic bronze medalists for New Zealand
Rowers at the 1972 Summer Olympics
Rowers at the 1976 Summer Olympics
Rowers from Auckland
World Rowing Championships medalists for New Zealand
Medalists at the 1976 Summer Olympics
Medalists at the 1972 Summer Olympics
New Zealand plumbers
New Zealand builders
European Rowing Championships medalists
20th-century New Zealand people